Enrique Martín Monreal Lizarraga (born 9 March 1956), known as Martín, is a Spanish football manager and former player who played as a forward.

His professional career was intimately connected with Osasuna, as both a player and coach.

Playing career
Born in Pamplona, Navarre, Martín spent his entire professional career with local CA Osasuna, making his debut in the 1979–80 season whilst the club was in Segunda División and helping it return to La Liga after a 17-year absence. He previously represented CD Tudelano and UE Lleida, both on loan.

Subsequently, until his retirement in 1988 at the age of 32, Martín always competed in the top flight, his first game in the competition taking place on 7 September 1980 in a 1–0 home win against UD Las Palmas. His best outputs occurred in that and the 1982–83 campaigns, when he netted seven times from 34 appearances.

In May 1982, Osasuna rejected an offer of 80 million pesetas from Real Madrid. Martín played three matches with his main team in the 1985–86 UEFA Cup, scoring in a 2–0 home victory over Rangers in the first round (2–1 on aggregate); he earned two caps for Spain, his debut coming on 27 October 1982 in a 1–0 defeat of Iceland for the UEFA Euro 1984 qualifiers (six minutes played in Málaga).

Coaching career
Martín worked with Osasuna from 1990 to 1999, being in charge of the youth sides, the reserves and the main squad. In 1993–94, he was one of two coaches as the latter suffered top-flight relegation after ranking in last position.

After leaving the Rojillos, Martín coached in the second tier with CD Leganés (two spells), Burgos CF, Terrassa FC, Xerez CD and CD Numancia. He led the second club to the 16th position out of 22 teams in the 2001–02 season, but saw it suffer administrative relegation; during one of his spells with Léganes he earned notoriety for racing onto the pitch to tackle a CD Badajoz player, and earned a ten-game ban.

On 5 May 2015, after another two stints with Osasuna B (two full seasons, three games in 2011–12), Martín returned to the first team, seriously threatened with relegation in division two. After managing to narrowly avoid relegation he achieved promotion to the top flight in the following campaign, through the play-offs; on 7 November 2016, however, with the side in the relegation zone, he was sacked.

Martín was named manager of Albacete Balompié in the second division on 5 October 2017. The following 4 June, after avoiding relegation, he left the club.

On 23 October 2018, Martín replaced José Antonio Gordillo at the helm of Gimnàstic de Tarragona, suffering relegation at the end of the season. On 20 June 2019 he was appointed at Córdoba CF who also dropped down from the second tier, being dismissed after nearly four months in charge.

Managerial statistics

References

External links

1956 births
Living people
Spanish footballers
Footballers from Pamplona
Association football forwards
La Liga players
Segunda División players
Segunda División B players
CA Osasuna B players
CA Osasuna players
CD Tudelano footballers
UE Lleida players
Spain under-23 international footballers
Spain B international footballers
Spain international footballers
Spanish football managers
La Liga managers
Segunda División managers
Segunda División B managers
CA Osasuna managers
CD Leganés managers
Burgos CF managers
Terrassa FC managers
Xerez CD managers
CD Numancia managers
Albacete Balompié managers
Gimnàstic de Tarragona managers
Córdoba CF managers